is a railway station in Kashiba, Nara Prefecture, Japan.

Line
Kintetsu Railway
Osaka Line

Layout
The elevated station has two side platforms serving a track each.

Daily usage
In recent years, the results of the survey of the passengers on the day of the station are as follows:

2015,November 10 4,630.
2012,November 13 4,544.
2010,November 9 4,450.
2008,November 18 4,338.
2005,November 8 4,476.

Adjacent stations

Railway stations in Nara Prefecture